Bob Cunningham (December 28, 1934 – April 1, 2017) was an American jazz bassist.  Cunningham was born on December 28, 1934, in Cleveland. In the 1990s he was a member of The 3B's, with Bross Townsend and Bernard Purdie. He died in New York on April 1, 2017, at the age of 82.

Discography

As leader
1985: Walking Bass (Nilva)

With The 3B's
 1993: After Hours with The 3B's
 1994: Soothin' n Groovin' with The 3B's

As sideman
With Gary Bartz
 Home! (Milestone, 1970)
With Walt Dickerson
 Impressions of a Patch of Blue (MGM, 1965)
With Frank Foster
Fearless Frank Foster (Prestige, 1965)
Soul Outing! (Prestige, 1966)
With Dizzy Gillespie
 An Electrifying Evening with the Dizzy Gillespie Quintet (Verve, 1961)
With Bill Hardman 
Saying Something (Savoy 1961)
With Freddie Hubbard
 Backlash (Atlantic, 1967)
With The Jazz Composer's Orchestra
 The Jazz Composer's Orchestra (JCOA, 1968)
With Yusef Lateef
 The Gentle Giant (Atlantic, 1972)
Part of the Search (Atlantic, 1973)
 10 Years Hence (Atlantic, 1974)
 The Doctor Is In... and Out (Atlantic, 1976)
With Junior Mance
 Harlem Lullaby (Atlantic, 1967)
 I Believe to My Soul (Atlantic, 1968)
With The New York Art Quartet
 Call It Art (Triple Point, 2013)
With Dakota Staton
Ms. Soul (Groove Merchant, 1974)
With Leon Thomas
The Leon Thomas Album (Flying Dutchman, 1970)

References

External links
Discogs
Allmusic credits

1934 births
2017 deaths
American jazz double-bassists
Male double-bassists
Bebop double-bassists
Swing double-bassists
Hard bop double-bassists
Avant-garde jazz double-bassists
American male jazz musicians
The 3B's members